The St. Paul's Episcopal Church is a Gothic Revival church in Port Townsend, Washington.  It was listed on the National Register of Historic Places in 1970.  It is included in Port Townsend Historic District which was declared a National Historic Landmark in 1977.

References

National Register of Historic Places in Port Townsend, Washington
Episcopal churches in Washington (state)
Carpenter Gothic church buildings in Washington (state)